John Sahr Francis Yambasu is the Ambassador Extraordinary & Plenipotentiary of the Republic of Sierra Leone to the Russian Federation 
, Czech Republic, Poland, Ukraine, Hungary and CIS States.

References

External links
Sierra Leone Embassy, Moscow

Ambassadors of Sierra Leone to Russia
Ambassadors of Sierra Leone to the Czech Republic
Ambassadors of Sierra Leone to Poland
Ambassadors of Sierra Leone to Ukraine
Ambassadors of Sierra Leone to Hungary
Living people
Year of birth missing (living people)